Carramar railway station is located on the Main South line, serving the Sydney suburb of Carramar. It is served by Sydney Trains T3 Bankstown Line services.

History
Carramar station opened as South Fairfield on 8 October 1924 when the Main South line was extended from Regents Park to Cabramatta. It was renamed Carramar on 1 July 1926.

To the south of the station lies the Southern Sydney Freight Line that opened in January 2013.

Platforms and services
Historically Carramar was served by services from the city and Lidcombe operating to Liverpool. This changed in the early 2000s, when most services to Liverpool were altered to operate via Bankstown. Today Carramar is served by T3 Bankstown Line services terminating at Liverpool and three Liverpool / City via Strathfield services on weekdays.

References

External links

Carramar station details Transport for New South Wales

Railway stations in Sydney
Railway stations in Australia opened in 1924
Main Southern railway line, New South Wales
City of Fairfield